Undetectable = Untransmittable (U=U) is a message used in HIV campaigns. It means that if someone has an undetectable viral load, they cannot sexually transmit HIV to others. U=U is supported by numerous health groups and organisations worldwide, including the World Health Organization (WHO). The validity of U=U has been proven through many clinical trials involving thousands of couples. U=U is also used as an HIV prevention strategy: if someone is undetectable, they can not pass it further and hence, prevents the virus from spreading. This is known as Treatment as Prevention (TasP).

Origins 
The U=U campaign was launched by the Prevention Access Campaign in early 2016 from a Scientific Consensus Statement. It aims to change what it means to live with HIV by raising awareness and dismantling the stigma around HIV, improving the quality of life of those living with it in order to end the epidemic.

Scientific evidence 
The campaign seeks to spread the scientific evidence that undetectable means untransmittable. Since the beginning of the epidemic, perceptions and management of HIV infection have gone through many stages; from assuming the infectiousness, then discovering the routes of transmission (blood, sexual fluids, and breastfeeding), to prevention methods (education, condoms, PrEP, and PEP) and various different treatments.

Between 2011 and 2019, three clinical studies appeared that have changed the paradigm of prevention and quality of life for the better.  These studies confirmed that access to and adherence to treatment, such that the virus remains "undetectable" in routine blood tests:

 Prevents the infection from progressing in the person taking antiretrovirals; and also
 Prevents the virus from being transmitted during sexual activity.

In 2011, the study group published part of the results of the HPTN 052 study. In this clinical study, 1,763 serodiscordant heterosexual couples were studied (one person HIV positive, the other testing negative). The subjects were then divided into two groups, depending on whether the person had started treatment as soon as they received the diagnosis, or if they deferred the start of the treatment. It was discovered that, when comparing both groups, there was a 93% reduction in transmissions in those who started treatment immediately. The researchers then concluded that, if the person continues their treatment, they are less likely to transmit the infection to a sexual partner.

In 2016, the same group published the results of the PARTNER-1 study. In this study, the conditions were far more specific and the question more targeted. A total of 1,166 serodiscordant heterosexual and MSM couples were included. In all cases, the person living with HIV had a plasma viral load of less than 200 copies per mL of blood. The couples also reported not having used condoms during sexual intercourse. After 36,000 instances of intercourse in heterosexual couples and 22,000 in MSM couples, there was no related transmission of HIV. For this reason, it was decided to continue studying more encounters and more couples, because even the number studied did not have enough statistical power.

In 2019, the additional results of PARTNER-2 were published. In this study, serodiscordant MSM couples were analysed in which the person living with HIV had had an undetectable viral load for six months or more. 76,991 sexual acts without condom use were documented with no related transmission. This study is therefore the one that allows us to affirm that the risk of sexual transmission of HIV is 0 when the person with HIV has an undetectable viral load for 6 months or more.

International organisations 
945 organizations in 99 countries have committed to spreading the U=U message in their communities as part of a Prevention Access initiative. This has created an alliance of people living with HIV, researchers, and social organizations whose goal is, on the one hand, to end the epidemic of HIV infection, as well as the stigma related to living with HIV. For this, the campaign sought to bring scientific information closer through a language of disclosure so that all people, regardless of their training, ethnicity or socioeconomic level, can learn about the new advances.

Actions 
In 2015, Bruce Richman founded the Prevention Access Campaign with the aim of connecting activists and researchers from around the world to spread the message of U=U , which has been carried out since 2016. It has received the support of numerous organizations all over the world:

 The Fight Against AIDS Foundation has declared its support for the U=U consensus statement issued by the Prevention Access Campaign stating that "the scientific evidence is clear and unequivocal: effective treatment reduces the risk of HIV transmission to zero".
 The International Council of AIDS Service Organizations (ICASO) is a community dedicated to monitoring and updating regarding issues related to U=U in women living with HIV.
 UNAIDS has carried out a series of campaigns with the aim of spreading the message, based on reports but also supporting the activities of other civil associations aimed at promoting the message.
 For World AIDS Day 2019, Fundación Huésped has carried out a campaign that includes ten measures to end HIV in Argentina: “Put on the ribbon”. One of the measures says to "Promote the concept of undetectable = untransmittable (U=U)".
 The Positive Cycle Association has carried the slogan U=U as a flag since its founding in 2018, carrying out numerous activities with the aim of guaranteeing its visibility. Among them talks-debate with figures such as Gabriela Turck, CONICET researcher on issues related to reservoirs and the cure of HIV; or activities with the community such as the one carried out during the 2019 pride march that has had the support and collaboration of UNAIDS .

See also 
 Serophobia
 Joint United Nations Programme on HIV/AIDS

References 

HIV/AIDS
HIV/AIDS prevention organizations